The Royal New Zealand Navy has several long-term projects to retain and update its capabilities for the future.

2019 Defence Capability Plan

In June 2019 the NZ Ministry of Defence released the Defence Capability Plan 2019  which superseded the previous 2016 Defence White Paper produced by the National Government. Revealed in the 2019 DCP was the NZDF's intention to:
 Retire immediately two of the Lake-class inshore patrol vessels. In 2022, Rotoiti, along with her sister Pukaki, was sold to Ireland for use by the Irish Naval Service.
 Procure a new offshore patrol vessel from 2027 to patrol the southern ocean, built to commercial standards, and costing approximately $300–600 million. The future of the remaining two Lake-class inshore patrol vessels will be reassessed. On March 15 2022, the Ministry of Defence announced that the project is postponed indefinitely due to financial and prioritization constraints. 
 Replace the SH-2G(I) Super Seasprite helicopter from 2027, projected cost up to $1 billion.
 Procure 2 new enhanced sea lift vessels, 1 supplementing HMNZS Canterbury from 2029 before being replaced in 2035 by the second vessel. The vessels, through the provision of a well dock will be able to conduct operations in a wider range of sea conditions, and will have the size and capacity to carry large equipment, and sufficient aviation capacity to allow extended, long duration operations. Its size will also provide for the transport of a larger number of personnel.
An enhanced service and maintenance package to allow the extension of the two ANZAC frigates expected service lives beyond 2030,
 Replace the Protector-class Offshore Patrol vessels by early 2030's.
 Replace the Anzac-class frigates by the mid 2030's.

References

Further reading
 https://www.defence.govt.nz/what-we-do/delivering-defence-capability/defence-capability-plan/

External links
Royal New Zealand Navy
Ministry of Defence

Royal New Zealand Navy

no:Royal New Zealand Navy